Scipio Township, Ohio may refer to:

Scipio Township, Meigs County, Ohio
Scipio Township, Seneca County, Ohio

Ohio township disambiguation pages